The Next: Fame Is at Your Doorstep  is an American hour-long reality series on The CW television network that consists of a music competition to find new talent, the winner of the competition will receive a recording contract with Atlantic Records. The show is produced by CBS's Raquel Productions in association with 25/7 Productions, LLC and Flavor Unit Entertainment, Inc, and it is produced by Dave Broome (The Biggest Loser), Shakim Compere, and Queen Latifah. The series premiered on August 16, 2012.

Format 
In each episode of The Next, four mentors drop in on the lives of four up-and-coming local musicians. When the session is up, the four newly groomed artists go head-to-head at a well-known local venue. with the audience consisting of friends and family, as well as local music fans. The winner moves on to represent their city in the semi-finals.

Mentors 

Gloria Estefan was invited to form part of the main cast, liking the idea mainly because she would not judge, but help the contestant make a good presentation onstage.

Though Joe Jonas was about to say no to the project, mostly due to a busy schedule, the producers were persistent. After arranging a meeting with him, they gave Jonas a spiel of the show, raising the interest for the program, due to the way it would be directed and for giving the opportunity to new artists the chances they deserved.  Producers of the show later stated that they wished they hadn't been so persistent in pursuing Jonas, as his lack of personality was clearly evident on the show, particularly when being compared to John Rich.

Rapper Nelly was invited personally by producer Dave Broome to the show, and though he wasn't sure at the beginning, it was the original direction different from other music competition shows which made him accept the mentoring role.

John Rich, an accomplished country music singer/songwriter, producer, and one half of the duo Big & Rich, provided most of the personality for the show.  Known for being offbeat, Rich's mentorship was often the highlight of each episode.  In the end, it would be a performer mentored by Rich who would end up winning the competition.  Rich also performed the most of any of the mentors, being featured 3 of the 5 times.  These performances displayed Rich's talents in a variety of formats as he sang and played lead guitar with Nelly on a powerful rendition of "American Woman", then did "Superstition" with Gloria Estefan, and in the final episode performed the inspiring "That's Why I Pray" with Big & Rich partner Kenny Alphin.

Auditions 
The following table contains all the contestants of the season and the song they performed. The participants highlighted in green were chosen by the public in each city to continue to the next round. The participant highlighted in blue was chosen by the public as a wildcard to continue to the next round.

Semifinals 
The first round of the semifinals were broadcast live on The CW from the Orpheum Theater in Los Angeles on September 27. Jordan Baird, Ali Brustofski, Krystle Cruz, Iliana, Ashley Kimbrae, Michael Ray were selected from their respective cities to compete.

Finals 
Semifinalist Michael Ray, mentored by John Rich, was already voted to perform at the final night, that same night Iliana, mentored by Gloria Estefan was voted as the second semifinalist for the final round. Performances for the third candidates were made, getting Jordan Baird mentored by Joe Jonas, the most public votes to make it to the finale.

Michael, who had John Rich as his mentor, sang Barefoot Blue Jean Night by Jake Owen. He sounded just like he should have an album out already. Iliana decided to choose an older song. She came out to sing Will You Still Love Me Tomorrow. The mentors thought it was a gamble, but they loved it. Jordan impressed Joe with a Ne-Yo song, and he even got the girls in the audience screaming.

Before the winner was announced, some bloopers were shown from the previous few weeks, and the seven contestants came back on stage together to sing Good Life. The mentors also showed off their talent by singing Tell Me Something Good.

After the votes were counted, the winner of The Next was Michael Ray. Michael will be getting that record contract with Atlantic Records.

Performances by guests/coaches

Ratings

Media sponsorship 
Cricket Wireless is the main presenter of the music competition. The Next interacts with Cricket smartphones, using Muve Music and prepares them for the competition by exploring music playlists for inspiration or by selecting songs to perform. Muve Music will be featured prominently in the reality series.

References

External links

2010s American reality television series
2012 American television series debuts
2012 American television series endings
English-language television shows
Music competitions in the United States
The CW original programming